Govind Vasantha (born 29 October 1988) is an Indian composer, singer, and violinist who works predominantly in Malayalam and Tamil films. He is one of the founding members of the musical band Thaikkudam Bridge, in which he is a vocalist and violinist. He won the Filmfare Award for Best Music Director – Tamil for his work in 96.

Personal life
He is from a musical family in Irinjalakuda, Thrissur, Kerala. His father Peethambaran’s  elder brother Gopinathan was a Carnatic musician and his early exposure to music has been through his uncle. Govind changed his surname from Menon to Vasantha, taking his mother's name, becoming Govind Vasantha as an effort towards removing caste, providing an equality even on name-optics which was revealed by Vijay Sethupathi on a show on a Tamil television channel. Govind Vasantha is a founder member of the musical sensation Thaikkudam Bridge. His father Peethambaran  has been a star performer of Thaikkudam Bridge, since his retirement from the Government Services in the Irrigation Department in 2012.

Filmography

 As composer

References

External links
 

Indian violinists
Living people
Indian male film score composers
Malayalam film score composers
Tamil film score composers
Malayalam playback singers
Musicians from Kerala
Tamil playback singers
21st-century Indian composers
21st-century violinists
1988 births
21st-century Indian male singers
21st-century Indian singers